Arthur W. Westover (9 May 1864 – 14 August 1935) was a Canadian sport shooter who competed at the 1908 Summer Olympics.

In the 1908 Olympics he won the silver medal with the Canadian trap shooting team. In the individual trap shooting event he finished fifth.

References

External links
Arthur Westover's profile at databaseOlympics

1864 births
1935 deaths
Canadian male sport shooters
Olympic shooters of Canada
Shooters at the 1908 Summer Olympics
Olympic silver medalists for Canada
Olympic medalists in shooting
Medalists at the 1908 Summer Olympics
20th-century Canadian people